Kazimira Danutė Prunskienė (born 26 February 1943) is a Lithuanian politician who was the first prime minister of Lithuania after the declaration of independence of 11 March 1990, and Minister of Agriculture in the government of Gediminas Kirkilas.

She was the leader of the Peasants and New Democratic Party Union and the Lithuanian People's Party. From 1981 to 1986, she worked in West Germany.

She ran in the 2004 Lithuanian presidential election against  Valdas Adamkus, hoping to receive votes from supporters of impeached president Rolandas Paksas. She finished in second place in the first round and was defeated in the runoff.

Prunskienė is also a member of the Council of Women World Leaders, an International network of current and former women presidents and prime ministers whose mission is to mobilize the highest-level women leaders globally for collective action on issues of critical importance to women and equitable development.

Early life and education 

Prunskienė was born as Kazimira Danutė Stankevičiūtė in the village of Vasiuliškė, Ostland (now Lithuania). Her father, Pranas Stankevičius, worked as a forest ranger and owned several hectares of land. Known as a jolly musician who played many instruments at country weddings, including the guitar, fiddle, concertina, and a pipe of his own making, Stankevičius was killed by the NKVD in the Labanoras Forest when Kazimira was just one year old.

Prunskienė attended Vilnius University, earning her degree in economics in 1965 and later earned her doctorate from the same university in the same subject during the late 1980s. Afterwards, she stayed on at the university first as an instructor, then as a senior associate in the Department of Industrial Economics.

Before getting her first degree, Prunskienė married Povilas Prunskus. Between 1963 and 1971 she bore three children — a son named Vaidotas and two daughters called Rasa and Daivita. She would later divorce her first husband and remarry in 1989 to Algimantas Tarvidas.

Political career 

Prunskienė shifted slowly from university to government circles. Joining the Lithuanian Communist Party in 1980, by 1986 she began acting as the deputy director for the Lithuanian Soviet Socialist Republic's Agricultural Economics Research Institute. In 1988 Prunskienė helped found the grass-roots Lithuanian restructuring movement Sąjūdis, which eventually grew into Lithuania's leading pro-independence group. In late 1980s Prunskienė became Deputy Chairwoman of Council of Ministers of Lithuanian SSR.

She was elected to the position of the Prime Minister of the first government on 17 March by the Supreme Council of Lithuania. By this, she became the first woman to become Prime Minister of Lithuania and first Prime Minister after 11 March 1990. She immediately faced the problems brought on by an economic embargo set in place by Mikhail Gorbachev in an attempt to force Lithuania back under control of the crumbling USSR. Prunskienė flew to countries all over the world, including the United States, to try to gain support for negotiations with Gorbachev about the embargo through such committees as the Helsinki Commission. After nine months in office, Prunskienė resigned and later headed the Department of Agriculture in Lithuania.

In 1994 Prunskienė left the Democratic Labour Party of Lithuania. The next year she became leader of Lithuanian Women Party. She was also the leader of the Peasants and New Democracy Union, before leaving it in 2009. She established the Lithuanian People's Party soon afterwards.

Writings 

At the Vital Voices Conferences, held on 10 July 1997 in Vienna, Austria, Prunskienė published The Role Of Women In Democracy: The Experience Of Lithuania. Here she addresses women's vastly unequal pay in comparison to men, the conservative tradition of a Catholic country, and the general status of women and their level of political influence in Lithuania.

Notes

References 
 Smith, David. The Baltic States: Estonia, Latvia and Lithuania. Routledge. 2002
 Opfell, Olga. Women Prime Ministers and Presidents. Jefferson, North Carolina: McFarland and Co., 1993.
 "Hearing before the Commission on Security and Cooperation in Europe: Meeting with Prime Minister Kazimiera Prunskiene of Lithuania." Implementation of the Helsinki Accords. One Hundred First Congress Second Session. 1990.
 Prunskienė, Kazimira. "The Role Of Women In Democracy: The Experience Of Lithuania." 10 July 1997
 "Lithuania—Agricultural Minister keeps her position." The Baltic News Service 11 Sept 2007 1. 28 APR 2008
 Torild Skard (2014) 'Kazimiera Prunskiene' "Women of power - half a century of female presidents and prime ministers worldwide", Bristol: Policy Press

External links 
 Homepage of Kazimiera Prunskienė
 Kazimira Prunskienė details at the Seimas of the Republic of Lithuania page
 Kazimira Prunskienė details at the Government of the Republic of Lithuania page
 Ministry of Agriculture page

1943 births
20th-century Lithuanian women politicians
20th-century Lithuanian politicians
21st-century Lithuanian politicians
Knights Commander of the Order of Merit of the Federal Republic of Germany
Communist Party of Lithuania politicians
Democratic Labour Party of Lithuania politicians
New Democracy Party (Lithuania) politicians
Lithuanian Farmers and Greens Union politicians
Lithuanian People's Party politicians
Living people
Ministers of Agriculture of Lithuania
People of the KGB
People of the Singing Revolution
Prime Ministers of Lithuania
Academic staff of Vilnius Gediminas Technical University
Vilnius University alumni
Women government ministers of Lithuania
Women members of the Seimas
Women prime ministers
21st-century Lithuanian women politicians
Members of the Seimas